Albert Hubbard (born June 29, 1927) is an American synchronized swimmer, choreographer and coach. He is also an aquatic artist as well as historian of the International Academy of Aquatic Art.

Sportive career 1946-1954
Hubbard started synchronized swimming shortly after it was introduced in his birth town Detroit in 1946 by swimmers from Chicago. In 1949 he won the first Men's AAU Synchronised Swimming competition in the duet St.Louis Blues March with Lee Embrey. As male soloist he became the US Junior National Champion in 1954 with A Viking's Prayer Before Battle.

1955-present: Aquatic Artist, choreographer and historian
With the introduction of the International Academy of Aquatic Art (IAAA) in 1955 men were welcomed in synchronized swimming events, and Hubbard created and performed as aquatic artist until 2009 in various compositions, especially solos, at many IAAA festivals throughout North America. In 1960 he choreographed two mixed trios Othello after Verdi's Otello and A Medieval Morality that were the first to receive top honors from IAAA in that category. At that festival he presented the first male solo A World of Silence to be awarded First Class Honors from the IAAA. As the historian of the IAAA he documents the organization's history and artistic activities, and shares such information in IAAA's newsletter The Aquatic Artist.

Further reading
Robert E. Kerper: Splash - Aquatic Shows from A to Z (published by Michael Zielinsky, 2002)
Beulah Gundling: Exploring Aquatic Art, International Academy of Aquatic Art, 1963.
Beulah Gundling: Dancing in the Water, International Academy of Aquatic Art, 1976.
Dawn Pawson Bean: Synchronized swimming - An American history. McFarland Company Inc. Publishers, Jefferson (North Carolina, USA), 2005.
Johanna Beisteiner: Art music in figure skating, synchronized swimming and rhythmic gymnastics/Kunstmusik in Eiskunstlauf, Synchronschwimmen und rhythmischer Gymnastik. PhD thesis, Vienna 2005, (German). Contains information about Bert Hubbard and the IAAA (Chapter I/2: History of synchronized swimming, pages 40–55).

References

External links

Official website of the International Academy of Aquatic Art, contains information about Bert Hubbard
Official ISHOF website (International Swimming Hall of Fame) with information about the activities of the International Academy of Aquatic Art
2005 Who’s Who in Aquatic Leadership in the United States, Official Website of the United States Water Fitness Association, contains information about Bert Hubbard.

1927 births
American synchronized swimmers
Male synchronized swimmers
American choreographers
21st-century American historians
21st-century American male writers
Living people
Swimmers from Detroit
Historians from Michigan
American male non-fiction writers